Ziegfeld Girls were the chorus girls and showgirls from Florenz Ziegfeld's theatrical Broadway revue spectaculars known as the Ziegfeld Follies (1907–1931), in New York City,  which were based on the Folies Bergère of Paris.

Description

These showgirls followed on the heels of the Florodora girls, who had started to "loosen the corset" of the Gibson Girl in the early years of the 20th century. These beauties, decked out in Erté designs, gained many young male admirers and became objects of popular adoration. All of the showgirls looked very similar, both in appearance and in stature. They danced in complete synchronization, and were the only act that was uniform in the Ziegfeld Follies. Many were persuaded to leave the show to marry, some to men of substantial wealth. The Ziegfeld Ball in New York City continued as a social event of the season for years after the last production of the Follies.

In 1897, Ziegfeld married Anna Held, one of his Ziegfeld girls, by common-law. They were never legally married, but they lived together long enough to be considered so legally. In 1913, Held divorced Ziegfeld because of his infidelities with Lillian Lorraine, another Ziegfeld girl; soon after that, Held died and Ziegfeld went on to marry yet another Ziegfeld girl, future film star Billie Burke. Although Ziegfeld had several affairs, Burke claimed that Lorraine was the only one that made her jealous. Ziegfeld remained married to Burke (and in love with Lorraine) until his death in 1932.

List of Ziegfeld girls

Over the years, the Ziegfeld girls included many future stars such as Marion Davies, Paulette Goddard, Joan Blondell, Olive Thomas, Jeanne Eagels, Barbara Stanwyck, Billie Dove, Lilian Bond, Louise Brooks, Nita Naldi, Julanne Johnston, Mae Murray, Dorothy Mackaill, Odette Myrtil, Lilyan Tashman, Claire Dodd, Cecile Arnold, Dolores Costello, Dorothy Sebastian, Juliette Compton, Mary Nolan, Iris Adrian, Annette Bade. Other Ziegfeld girls went onto societal and business successes such as Peggy Hopkins Joyce, Helen Gallagher, Anastasia Reilly, Sybil Carmen, and Irene Hayes. Other Ziegfeld girls included Leone Sousa, Monica Van Munster, Mildred Chris Kennedy, Irene Amelia Melfi and Dorothy Hale.

Mona Louise Parsons was a Ziegfeld girl who was later a member of the Dutch resistance during the Second World War. Kiki Roberts, the lover of American gangster "Legs Diamond", was also a Ziegfeld girl.

Declined members

Although many future stars started out as Ziegfeld girls, many others were turned down by Florenz Ziegfeld to appear in his revue. Norma Shearer (in 1919 and 1920), Alice Faye (in 1927), Joan Crawford (in 1924), Gypsy Rose Lee (in 1927), Lucille Ball (in 1927 and 1931), Phyllis Haver (in 1915), Eleanor Powell (in 1927), Ruby Keeler (in 1924), Hedda Hopper (in 1913), and June Havoc (in 1927 and 1931) were among the many hopefuls that the master showman discarded after auditions.  In 1957, the then-current members were featured as mystery guests on the television panel show What's My Line?

Last survivors
The survivors of the chorus lines of the last century are The Rockettes of Radio City Music Hall.  Doris Eaton Travis became the last surviving Ziegfeld Girl after the death of Dorothy Raphaelson in 2005. Travis died on May 11, 2010 at the age of 106.

References

External links
 

Ziegfeld Follies